Bez zaklona is the second album by the Serbian rock band Night Shift, released in 2009. Unlike the previous album, consisting of cover versions, Bez zaklona consists of the band's own songs. As bonus track on the album appeared the promotional video for the opening track "Snovi".

Track listing 
All lyrics by Night Shift, except for track 9, written with Teodora Bojović.

Personnel

Night Shift 
 Milan Šćepanović - guitar, vocals, producer
 Danijel Šćepanović - drums
 Branislav Vukobratović - bass

Additional personnel 
 Marko Dacić - bass, vocals
 Teodora Bojović - vocals, backing vocals
 Intermezzo string quartet - string sections
 Mika Knežević - photography
 Boris Gavrilović - producer
 James Cruz - mastered by

References 

 Bez zaklona at the official Multimedia records site
 Bez zaklona at Discogs

External links
 Bez zaklona at the official Multimedia records site
 Bez zaklona at Discogs

Night Shift (band) albums
2009 albums
Serbian-language albums